is a railway station on the Hohi Main Line operated by JR Kyushu in Ōzu, Kumamoto, Japan.

Lines

Layout 
The station consists of a side and an island platform serving three tracks at grade. The station building is located on the north side and is a traditional Japanese style wooden structure which houses a staffed ticket window and a waiting room. Another, more modern building, built in 2011 is located at the south entrance. This houses the Ōzu town visitor centre. The bus stop for the Kumamoto Airport Liner shuttle is also situated in front of this building. Access to the platforms and between the station building and the visitor centre is by means of a level crossing.

Management of the station has been outsourced to the JR Kyushu Tetsudou Eigyou Co., a wholly owned subsidiary of JR Kyushu specialising in station services. It staffs the ticket window which is equipped with a Midori no Madoguchi facility.

Adjacent stations

History
On 2 December 1928, the entire track from Kumamoto to Ōita was designated as the Hōhi Main Line. With the privatization of Japanese National Railways (JNR), the successor of JGR, on 1 April 1987, the station came under the control of JR Kyushu.

JR Kyushu commenced repairs on this section in April 2017, starting from Higo-Ōzu to Tateno; services resumed on the entire section on August 8, 2020.

On 4 March 2017, Higo-Ōzu was given the nickname "Aso Kumamoto Airport Station" as it is the nearest railway station to Kumamoto Airport.

Passenger statistics
In fiscal 2016, the station was used by an average of 2,548 passengers daily (boarding passengers only), and it ranked 74th among the busiest stations of JR Kyushu.

See also
List of railway stations in Japan

References

External links
Higo-Ōzu (JR Kyushu)

Railway stations in Kumamoto Prefecture
Railway stations in Japan opened in 1914